Mark T. Smith (born January 12, 1968) is an American painter. His work has been used at Taco Bell restaurants.

Life
Born in Wilmington, Delaware, where he attended Archmere Academy, Smith moved to New York City in 1986 to study at the Pratt Institute. After graduating from Pratt, he made New York City his home until June 2004, before relocating to Miami for 14 years, Oahu, Hawaii, for a year, and then eventually settling in Seattle, WA in 2018. In 1990, Smith received his first commission from the Walt Disney Company. The project involved the creation of a poster for national distribution announcing the 19th birthday of Walt Disney World. Throughout his 20s, Smith made his living in New York City as an iconoclastic artist. Corporate patronage helped Smith become an increasingly recognizable figure in the crowded New York City art world, and his patrons included the likes of MTV, Pepsi, AT&T, Budweiser, VH-1, Taco Bell, and many more. Smith's work culminated in the national Absolut Vodka campaign in 1996, entitled "Absolut Smith".

His artwork has been displayed in the U.S. and abroad, and on the walls of collectors and the collections of celebrities like Jay Leno, Neil Diamond, and Elton John. He also hand-painted a pair of PT Cruisers that were commissioned by Daimler-Chrysler that were driven across the U.S. and exhibited at the Cannes Film Festival as part of a worldwide promotional tour. One vehicle was auctioned for the charity Operation Smile to a private collector, and the other is in the Walter P. Chrysler Museum’s permanent collection in Michigan.

In 2009, Smith was chosen as the first artist to "Paint on Pink". He painted on pink material recycled from the Pink Project, the art installation that launched Brad Pitt's Make It Right Foundation New Orleans.  The artwork created from this project and all of the proceeds were donated to Make It Right, whose purpose is to help "residents of New Orleans' Lower 9th Ward rebuild their lives and community in the wake of Hurricane Katrina."

Work
Smith's experience at the Pratt Institute reflected the toughness of New York, where he honed his figure drawing skills and learned what it meant to be an artist. New York City and Pratt gave birth to the maturing visual language of Smith, one that embraces the traditions of craftsmanship, dedication to craft, observational drawing, and the foundation of the masterworks of art history. At the same time, the visual language was mixed with the purely modern influences of graffiti, hip-hop, post-pop, and the vast sea of advertising, commercial, and designed visuals that are part of the everyday experience in New York City.[1]

According to Smith's Artist Statement on his webpage, his artwork embraces the classic skills of drawing and painting with the balance of a modern mindset. The artist expresses a desire to ignite an appreciation of the arts in the public by integrating visual art into the lives of the public in a meaningful way.

References

External links
Miami Moderns
CowParade

20th-century American painters
American male painters
21st-century American painters
21st-century American male artists
Living people
1968 births
20th-century American male artists